Fools is a 2003 Indian Telugu-language romantic comedy film directed by Dasari Narayana Rao and starring himself, Srinath and Gajala. The film is inspired by the Malayalam film Godfather although that film had already been remade into Telugu.

Plot 
Deepti's parents accuse her of being in love. Although Deepti is not in love, she runs into Narasimha Rao and falls in love with him to make her parent's accusation true. Narasimha Rao is part of a large family headed by his father, A. V. Narasimha Naidu, that includes five brothers (Ranga, Rajarao, Subbarao, Apparao, himself) and a sister. Narasimha Naidu did not marry off his sons because he wanted to find the perfect girl for them. However, his daughter was ostracized from the family after running away with another man. When Deepti and Narasimha Rao realize that they are part of the same family because Narasimha Rao's sister is Deepti's mother, they try to reunite the family.

Cast 

Dasari Narayana Rao as Ranga
Srinath as Narasimha Rao
Gajala as Deepti
Satyanarayana as A. V. Narasimha Naidu
Giri Babu as Rajarao 
Chandra Mohan as Subbarao
Sudhakar as Apparao
Brahmanandam
Kovai Sarala as Manga
L. B. Sriram
Shakeela
Ramya Sri
Rallapalli
Krishna as Deepti's father (guest appearance)
Jayasudha as Deepti's mother (guest appearance)
Krishna Kumari (guest appearance)

Production 
Durga Nageswara Rao, MS Kota Reddy, and Relangi Narasimha Rao worked as assistant director for the film with Relangi assisting with comedy scenes.

Soundtrack 
Music composed by Vandemataram Srinivas.

Reception 
Gudipoodi Srihari of The Hindu said that "This is a full-length comedy, enjoyable almost throughout its run with Dasari at the helm. He handles the subject well as its director. Newcomer Srinath acts with ease". A critic from Sify wrote that "The film looks too jaded with an old fashioned story. There`s nothing new in the way the film is packaged". Manju Latha Kalanidhi of Full Hyderabad opined that the film's plot is "flimsy" and non-existent.

References 

Films directed by Dasari Narayana Rao